Pandolfo Malatesta is the name of four members of the Italian House of Malatesta:

Pandolfo I Malatesta (c. 1267 - 1326)
Pandolfo II Malatesta (1325 - 1373), son of Malatesta I Malatesta
Pandolfo III Malatesta (c. 1369 -1427), brother of Carlo and father of Sigismondo Pandolfo; lord of Brescia and Bergamo, and fought against/for the Visconti
 (1390 - 1441), cardinal, son of Carlo

Pandolfo IV Malatesta (1475-1534), father of Sigismondo Malatesta

It can also refer to Sigismondo Pandolfo Malatesta, also condottiero and lord of Rimini